The 1995–96 Winnipeg Jets season was the team's 24th and their final season in Winnipeg before the franchise was moved to Phoenix, Arizona, and renamed the Phoenix Coyotes (now the Arizona Coyotes). The NHL returned to Winnipeg following the 2010–11 season, when the Atlanta Thrashers became the "new" Winnipeg Jets.

The Jets managed to qualify for the eighth and final playoff Western Conference playoff berth in their final season in Winnipeg. The Jets were eliminated in the first round in six games by the Presidents' Trophy winners, the Detroit Red Wings.

Off-season
The Jets picked Shane Doan of the Kamloops Blazers as their first-round pick, seventh overall.

Due to contractual disagreements, Keith Tkachuk was replaced as captain by Kris King.

Regular season
Their 36 wins were the highest since the Jets won 40 games during the 1992–93 season.

Season standings

Schedule and results

Playoffs
The Jets lost their first round series 4–2 to the Detroit Red Wings. Winnipeg played their last-ever game on April 28, 1996, a home playoff loss to the Red Wings, 4–1. Norm Maciver scored the last goal in original Jets history.

Relocation to Phoenix
As the National Hockey League (NHL) expanded into the United States, the team operating costs and salaries grew rapidly; this development put a high strain on the League's Canadian teams. As Winnipeg was the League's second-smallest market (eventually becoming the smallest market after the Quebec Nordiques moved to Denver, Colorado, in 1995), the Jets were unable to retain their best players. Various schemes were devised to save the team through a tremendous grassroots effort and government funds, but in the end, the efforts were not enough.

Despite strong fan support, the Winnipeg Jets were at a financial disadvantage with many American franchises. The team was sold to Phoenix businessmen Steven Gluckstern and Richard Burke, and in 1996, the club moved to Arizona and became the Phoenix Coyotes. In the summer that the move took place, the franchise saw the exit of Jets stars like Teemu Selanne and Alexei Zhamnov, while the team added established superstar Jeremy Roenick from the Chicago Blackhawks. Roenick teamed up with power wingers Keith Tkachuk and Rick Tocchet to form a dynamic 1–2–3 offensive punch that led the Coyotes through their first years in Arizona. Also impressive were young players Shane Doan (who was the last remaining original Jet active in the NHL), Oleg Tverdovsky and goaltender Nikolai Khabibulin, whom the fans nicknamed the "Bulin Wall."

Player statistics

Regular season
Scoring

Goaltending

Playoffs
Scoring

Goaltending

Awards and records

Transactions

Trades

Waivers

Free agents

Draft picks

References
 Jets on Hockey Database

Winnipeg Jets (1972–1996) seasons
Winnipeg Jets season, 1995-96
Winn